Zinkensdamms idrottsplats, usually Zinkensdamms IP or colloquially Zinken or Zinkens, is a sports ground in Södermalm in central Stockholm, Sweden.

The ground was designed by architect Paul Hedqvist and was inaugurated on 18 May 1937 with a football game between Reymersholms IK and Djurgårdens IF. 

Nowadays, it is mainly known for bandy, because Hammarby IF, playing in the highest bandy league in Sweden (Elitserien), use it as its home ground. The ice can be artificially frozen since 1986. It is also used as the home ground for association football team Reymersholms IK and American football team Stockholm Mean Machines. Matches were played at the 1997 European Lacrosse Championships.

References

Bandy venues in Sweden
Sports venues in Stockholm
Football venues in Stockholm
Bandy World Championships stadiums
American football venues in Sweden
Lacrosse venues
Sports venues completed in 1937
1937 establishments in Sweden